Alpha and Omega (1915) is a collection of essays, lectures, and letters written by Jane Ellen Harrison and published for Harrison during the outbreak of World War I.

Contents

Crabbed Age and Youth — read to Trinity College
Heresy and Humanity (1912) — published by the Cambridge Society of Heretics
Unanimism and Conversion — published by the Cambridge Society of Heretics
"Homo Sum" — letter to an anti-suffragist
Scientiae Sacra Fames — read before the London Sociological Society
The Influence of Darwinism on the Study of Religions — or "The Creation of Darwinism of the Scientific Study of Religions." (143)
Alpha and Omega — read to Trinity College; "if we are to keep our hold on Religion, theology must go." (179)
Art and Mr. Clive Bell — response to Art by Clive Bell (1914)
Epilogue on the War: Peace and Patriotism

Purpose
In Alpha and Omega'''s preface, Harrison explains why she published such various topics, ranging from magic to post-Impressionism, in one work.  She says, "Seen in the fierce glare of war, these theories -- academic in origin and interest -- ... seemed like faded photographs." (v-vi)  World War I had brought a melancholy to Harrison's life because pacifist leanings, as admitted in the Epilogue, isolated her.

References

Harrison, Jane Ellen. Alpha and Omega''. AMS Press: New York, 1973.

1915 non-fiction books
British non-fiction books
British essay collections
Books of lectures
Collections of letters